The United States Virgin Islands, often abbreviated USVI, are a group of islands and cays located in the Lesser Antilles of the Eastern Caribbean, consisting of three main islands (Saint Croix, Saint John, and Saint Thomas) and fifty smaller islets and cays. Like many of their Caribbean neighbors, the history of the islands is characterized by native Amerindian settlement, European colonization, and the Atlantic slave trade.

Before the colonial period, the islands were inhabited at different times by the Arawak, Ciboney, and Kalinago peoples. Europeans are first known to have encountered the islands during Columbus' second voyage. Over the next century, settlers from across western Europe laid claim to the land and the majority of indigenous peoples either perished or were displaced. The islands initially profited from the triangular trade, and many enslaved peoples were brought to the island, beginning in 1673. 

The islands were acquired by the Danish West India Company between 1672 and 1733, eventually becoming known as the Danish West Indies. Following a slave rebellion in 1848, slavery was abolished in the Danish territories, and the plantation economy of the islands collapsed. Faced with mounting deficits, the Danish Government then engaged in several attempts to sell the islands. After decades of negotiations, the United States purchased the islands in 1917. They officially became an unincorporated U.S. territory in 1927.

Pre-Columbian history
Archeological evidence shows that the Virgin Islands were inhabited for thousands of years before the arrival of Christopher Columbus. The earliest evidence of human presence on the islands comes from Saladoid style ceramics which have been dated to c. 250 BCE. 

The islands were inhabited at different times by the Arawak, Ciboney, and Kalinago peoples. Evidence suggests that all three tribes had been maritime peoples who subsisted primarily by hunting and gathering and used dugout canoes for transportation and subsistence fishing. The Ciboney are the first peoples thought to have settled the island, around 300–400 BCE, followed by the Arawaks around 100–200 CE. The origin of the Ciboney people is unknown, though the Arawaks are believed to have originated from Central America, having traveled through the Lesser Antilles to arrive at the Virgin Islands.

The Saladoid culture characterized the Virgin Islands until c. 600 CE. This period was followed by the Ostionoid culture. The increase in the size of archeological sites dating to the Ostionoid period shows that the islands experienced population growth during this era. The majority of rock art on the Virgin Islands is dated to the Ostionoid period, after 1000 CE. A variety of rock art sites are preserved on the modern-day United States Virgin Islands; on rock outcroppings on the coast near, Congo Cay, Botany Bay, and Robin Bay; petroglyphs at Salt River; and the Reef Bay figures at the base of a waterfall. Rock carvings made by the Arawak peoples during this era are preserved at the Virgin Islands National Park on St. John. 

During the 14th century, the Kalinago began settling the islands. Compared to the Arawak and Chiboney peoples, who had inhabited the islands for much of their history, the Kalinago had a more war-like society. Archeological remains of bows with poisoned arrows, javelins, and clubs are dated to this era. At the time of their arrival, the Arawak society already on the island was comparatively agricultural and primarily armed with spears. A significant number of the Arawak either fled or were killed by the Kalinago sometime before the arrival of Christopher Columbus in 1493. An archaeological site at Salt River Bay shows evidence of a religious center used by the Arawaks which the Kalinago took over during the 14th century. Remains of tools and everyday objects crafted from bone, shell, stone, cotton, grass, and hemp have also been discovered on the islands. Pottery from the Arawaks and Kalinago has also been preserved, while a lack of ceramic evidence suggests the Ciboneys did not work with clay. At the time of European exploration, Taíno was spoken throughout the Virgin Islands.

Early colonial period, 1493–1733

The first documented Europeans to visit the islands arrived with Christopher Columbus. Blown off course during his 1493–1496 voyage, Columbus landed on Saint Croix, then continued exploring Saint Thomas and Saint John. He gave the islands their original Spanish names—Santa Cruz, San Tomas, and San Juan—focusing on religious themes. The collection of tiny islets, cays, and rocks dotting the sea around them reminded Columbus of Saint Ursula and her 11,000 virgin martyrs, which inspired him to name the archipelago Santa Ursula y las Once Mil Virgenes (English: Saint Ursula and her Eleven Thousand Virgins). In practice, the name was shortened to Las Vîrgenes.

The first encounter Columbus had with the Kalinago quickly erupted into a battle. When Columbus and his crew decided to move on to other islands, they kidnapped six Arawaks to guide them. Although Columbus left without founding a colony, many more battles between the Spanish and Kalinago followed over the next century. Disease, forced labor, assaults, and murders took an enormous toll on both the Arawak and Kalinago populations. Spanish forces frequently raided the Virgin Islands, enslaving the indigenous people to work in mines of the Greater Antilles. Much of the population that was not captured eventually fled to the lower Caribbean islands. Around 1550, Charles V of Spain declared the native tribes enemies of the empire. As a result, most of the remaining indigenous population fled the Virgin Islands, were enslaved, or were killed soon thereafter.

While the islands of Saint Thomas and Saint John were not colonized until the 17th century, the island of Saint Croix saw several foreign settlements during the 16th century. The location of the island between possessions of the Spanish Empire, however, meant that it was settled by "only the most desperate English, French or Dutch settlers." Passing Spanish ships were known to raid islands of the Lesser Antilles; however, they favored a route through the northern Virgin Islands which frequently spared St. Croix.

In 1625, The English and Dutch took joint possession of Saint Croix. The island was later settled by the French too, and the English, Dutch, and French populations then lived in separate settlements. A 1645 conflict between the Dutch and English settlers resulted in the Dutch population fleeing to the Islands of St. Eustatius and St. Martin. The French population aligned with the Dutch and relocated to the island of Guadeloupe. Following the incident, the English colonists remained the sole political claimants to the island until 1650, when they were ambushed by Spanish forces from Puerto Rico. After the Spanish had forced the English settlers to flee, the Dutch thought the island safe to return to, but upon their return were also attacked by the Puerto Rican authorities.Upon learning the English had been expelled from St. Croix, the French Governor General of St. Christopher, Phillippe de Lonvilliers de Poincy, organized an annexation of the island, which defeated the Spanish forces. Approximately 300 French colonists were then sent to resettle on the island. The settlement was never profitable for the French despite further installments of colonists in 1659 and 1661. During this time, administration of the island passed through several organizations: the Company of the American Islands (1650), Knights Hospitaller (1651–1665), and the French West India Company (1665–1696). Because of high mortality rates and economic losses, a decision was made in 1696 to abandon the island, and the remaining colonists were relocated to Saint-Domingue.

Danish colonial period, 1672–1917

Danish West India Company 

Following the Treaty of Copenhagen in 1670, the Danish West India Company was chartered by Christian V in 1671. Through the charter, the company was permitted to annex any islands "as might be uninhabited and suitable for plantations, or if inhabited, then by such people who have no knowledge concerning us." In particular, the charter authorized the company to take possession of Saint Thomas, which was then annexed in 1672. Beginning in 1673, enslaved peoples were brought from Africa to work on plantations on St. Thomas.

Beginning in 1675, the company made several unsuccessful attempts to colonize Saint John. Governor Jørgen Iversen Dyppel stationed two men on the island in 1675, but no permanent settlement was made. In 1684, Governor Adolph Esmit employed two merchants from Barbados who then sent 40 men to occupy the island. Esmit had hoped that by involving citizens of the English empire in a purportedly economic endeavor, he would avoid military opposition to the island's occupation. However, two sloops were promptly sent by Governor William Stapleton of the nearby British Leeward Islands, which drove away the men occupying the island. In 1718, the company successfully annexed Saint John by establishing a settlement in Coral Bay. By 1733, St. John had a population of 1,295, 84% of which were enslaved peoples.

Following a drought in the late 1720s, the Danish West India Company sought to expand to the nearby island of St. Croix to acquire more arable land. The island had been unoccupied by its French owners since 1696. The French were willing to sell the island to the Danish to secure their neutrality and money for the War of the Polish Succession. In 1733, the Danish West India Company purchased Saint Croix from the French West India Company in exchange for 750,000 livres. The treaty which gave Denmark sovereignty stipulated that the islands could not be sold to another nation in the future without the consent of the French government: a requirement that became relevant 132 years later when the island was sold to the United States in 1917. When the Danish acquired it, there were approximately 150 British inhabitants and 400–500 enslaved people on Saint Croix. They were allowed to remain if they swore allegiance to the king of Denmark.

Faced with continued financial troubles, the Danish West India Company shareholders began to consider drastic measures to preserve their assets. As early as 1746, it was proposed that the king take over the company's collective assets at the general assembly of shareholders. In 1754, a John William Schopen presented King Frederick V with a petition on behalf of the St. Croix burgher council, requesting that the colonists on St. Croix be urgently placed under the direct sovereignty of the king. On May 9, 1754, the Board of Trade announced its advocacy for the King to assume direct control of the islands. By this point, the company was indebted an estimated 1,000,000 rigsdaler.

Royal colonies 

King Frederick V of Denmark–Norway assumed direct control of the former territories of the Danish West India Company in 1754, thus acquiring all of its assets and debts. Although the crown had acquired the company's assets, it had no intention of maintaining the islands as a public enterprise. The crown paid par value for the 1,250 shares of the company for a total of 1,250,000 rigsdalers. Collectively, the islands became known as the Danish West Indian Islands (Danish: De dansk-vestindiske øer). In 1766, the Danish West Indian rigsdaler was minted for the first time. It remained in use as the islands' currency until 1849, when it was replaced by the daler. Sugar production in the Danish West Indies drove the economy during royal control. At its peak in the late 18th century, more than 58% of the land area on St. Croix was in use for sugar cultivation. Across the islands, cotton, indigo, and tobacco plantations were also prevalent. These plantations relied, almost exclusively, on slave labor. 
British forces occupied the Danish West Indies in 1801–1802 and again from 1807–1815 during the Napoleonic Wars. Because Denmark was de facto allied with Napoleon, England occupied the islands to prevent them from being of military use to the French Empire. On both occasions, the islands had minimal naval protection and quickly surrendered to the occupying forces. The first occupation officially ended in 1802 with the Treaty of Amiens. The second invasion began in 1807 and lasted until 1815, when they were returned to Denmark in exchange for Heligoland through the Treaty of Paris.

Slavery and emancipation 

Under the control of the Danish West India Company, the islands expanded their reliance on a plantation economy and slave labor. Trading posts were set up on the islands by the company, trading in sugar, enslaved people, and other goods. The difficult conditions and enslavers' inhumane treatment created discontent. In 1733 a long drought followed by a devastating hurricane pushed enslaved people in St. John to the breaking point. In November of that year, approximately 150 enslaved members of the Akwamu tribe revolted, seizing control of the island during the 1733 slave insurrection on St. John. The Danish company enlisted the help of French and Swiss troops from Martinique to regain control. After all remaining rebels on the island were captured, the rebellion officially ended in late August of 1734. The colony's Afro-Caribbean population were more tightly controlled after the revolt.

By 1778, 3,000 enslaved Africans were estimated to have been brought to the Danish West Indies yearly. In 1789, enslaved people constituted 88% of the islands' population. As the commercial interests of the islands became more profitable, an increasing number of these enslaved peoples worked in ports rather than agricultural plantations.

A 1792 decree issued by King Christian VII attempted to prohibit the transatlantic slave trade, though the practice was not actually abolished within the kingdom until 1803. The delay in prohibiting international trade was reportedly to give plantation owners a chance to "stock up"; on St. John, for example, the number of enslaved people increased by 40% during the 11 year period. Even after 1803, the slave trade continued within the Danish West Indies, although importation was prohibited. By 1838, more than 100,000 enslaved people had been imported to the Danish West Indies; some of these were sold on to other colonies.

Pressure mounted in the following decades as some other colonial regimes in the Caribbean abolished slavery completely: Great Britain in 1833 and France in 1848. The Governor General of the Danish West Indies, Peter von Scholten, traveled to Denmark to petition for the emancipation of enslaved peoples within the kingdom in 1833. His views were likely influenced by his free-colored mistress Anna Heegaard. Though his petition was unsuccessful, in 1834 von Scholten secured an ordinance which allowed an enslaved person to purchase their freedom without the expressed consent of the slaveholder. 

In 1848, King Christian VIII enacted a gradual abolition of slavery, ruling that every child born would be free from birth and promising that slavery would be entirely abolished at a later date. Dissatisfied by these meager appeasements, the enslaved population of the islands remained in a state of unrest. General Buddhoe (Moses Gottlieb) and Admiral Martin King organized a rebellion, and on July 2, 1848, approximately 8,000 people gathered outside of Fort Frederik. On July 3, 1848, General Buddhoe delivered an ultimatum, declaring that the crowd would burn down the surrounding town of Frederiksted unless emancipation was declared within the next four hours. Governor Von Scholten promptly announced that "all unfree in the Danish West Indies are from today emancipated." Today, July 3rd is celebrated in the U.S. Virgin Islands as Emancipation Day. In reality, the Governor-General did not have the authority to abolish slavery. As a result, von Scholten was denounced by enslavers and members of the Danish government who stood to lose a large part of their wealth through emancipation. He was summoned before a commission of enquiry for his actions and deprived of his pension. However, he was eventually exonerated by the Supreme Court. In 1853, the Danish Parliament awarded enslavers compensation, at 50 dollars per enslaved person, which was largely paid out in government bonds.

After the abolition of slavery in 1848, conditions for formerly enslaved workers on the islands did not improve significantly. Workers were paid meager rates, struggled to provide for themselves, and in most cases, were still employed at the same plantations as before the rebellion. A labor law of 1849 mandated a working wage but also ruled that workers could only change employment once a year on October 1. Continued insecurity and unrest among the working population eventually led to the 1878 St. Croix labor riot, in which most of Frederiksted and around 50 surrounding plantations were destroyed by fire. Conditions and pay improved slightly after the rebellion, though the freed slave population continued to be exploited and discriminated against.

Negotiations of sale 

After the abolition of slavery in the islands, the plantation economy of the islands collapsed. Sugar produced in St. Croix was met with intense competition on the global market, while shipping and trade on St. Thomas had already declined. The islands became a financial and strategic burden to the Danish state. Meanwhile, the United States had become interested in the islands as a strategic military hold in the Caribbean. On-and-off negotiations with the United States to sell the islands began in 1866 and were not fully concluded until 1917. 

Spurred on by fears that Prussia and Austria would annex the islands after defeating Denmark in the Second Schleswig War, William H. Seward entered into negotiations with Waldemar Raasløff in 1866. As a result of their talks, a treaty was signed on October 24, 1867, in which the Americans would acquire St. Thomas and St. John in exchange for 7.5 million dollars in gold. At the King's instance, a referendum was held on the islands on January 9, 1868, in which the overwhelming majority voted in favor of the sale. Despite widespread support for the treaty, the United States Senate failed to ratify it before its deadline in April 1870. The agreement for purchase then elapsed.

American interest in the colonies was renewed in 1899 when rumors spread that they might be sold to Germany. The U.S. offered Denmark $3.5 million in gold for all three islands. Negotiations on the sale price and the privileges of the island populations then ensued. On January 24, 1902, an agreement was finally reached, and a treaty was signed. The United States Congress ratified the treaty in February. In Denmark, the lower house approved the sale on March 14 by a vote of 88 to 7, but the conservative upper house found itself at an impasse. A vote on October 22, 1902, was evenly split, with 32 votes for the sale and 32 against it. As a result, the treaty was not ratified and met the same fate as its 1868 predecessor. The United States' first secretary in London, Henry White attributed the failure to the influence of Kaiser Wilhelm II of the ascendent German Empire.

During World War I, US interest in the islands was revived by fear of German expansion into the Caribbean. In particular, it was feared that Germany would seize the islands for use as a U-boat base or coaling station. The islands were strategically located for the United States on the Atlantic approach to the newly completed Panama Canal. The US offered $25,000,000, and the third sales treaty was signed on August 4, 1916. On August 17, an unofficial referendum on the sale of the islands to the United States was held in the Danish West Indies, in which 99% of voters within the islands were in favor of the sale. At the following non-binding referendum held in Denmark on December 14, 64% of the public also voted in favor of the sale. The treaty was then ratified by the Danish parliament on December 20, 1916, signed by the King of Denmark on December 22, and signed by the US President on January 16, 1917. The United States officially took possession of the islands on March 31, 1917, when Danish ambassador Constantin Brun was presented with a warrant for the agreed $25 million in gold. Thus, nearly 250 years of Danish administration ended, and the territory became the United States Virgin Islands.

American period, 1917–present

On March 31, 1917, the United States officially took possession of the islands, which were then renamed the Virgin Islands of the United States. The day which sovereignty changed hands is celebrated annually as Transfer Day.

Most residents were granted U.S. citizenship in 1936. Through an act of 1932, all natives of the Virgin Islands who on the date of the act were residing in the continental United States or any of its insular possessions or territories were declared U.S. citizens. Today, the population of the United States Virgin Islands forms a complex society with multiple diverse ethnic groups: Virgin Islanders, Eastern Caribbean Islanders, Puerto Ricans, Dominicans, Europeans, Americans (locally known as "continentals"), Arabs, and Asians. At least one writer feels the ethnic and cultural practices and institutions that remain, migration, and the influence of the mainland United States have made the society more pluralistic than given it any common Virgin Islands identity. Virgin Islander Americans include people born there, plus immigrants from the British Virgin Islands, and their descendants. It also includes migrants from the U.S. Virgin Islands to the U.S. mainland. American citizenship was conferred in 1927, and U.S. citizens moving between the Virgin Islands and the rest of the U.S can do so without the need for a passport.

Knowing of his interest in graphic design, Rear Admiral Kitten ordered a yeoman, Percival Wilson Sparks, who was married to St. Thomas native, Grace Itah Maria Joseph Sparks, to design a new flag for the territory. Sparks designed the flag and had his wife and her sister, Blanche Joseph Sasso, sew the first flag for the U.S.V.I. The professionally made flags had to be manufactured in the States and would take weeks to arrive by ship. The sisters from St. Thomas were then known as the Betsy Rosses of the Virgin Islands.

While the Danish West Indies had been purchased from Denmark in 1917, Water Island, off the coast of St. Thomas, remained under private administration by the East Asiatic Company. TThe Danish had first settled the island in the late 17th century. Amid growing fear that the company might be used as a front for a German naval base, the U.S. purchased eminent domain of the island on June 19, 1944, for $10,000. From 1944–1996, the island remained a federal property. Control of the island was transferred to the United States Virgin Islands government on December 12, 1996, for $25 million. Archeological surveys conducted in 1998 identified several historical sites on the island, including the remains of pre-colonial shell middens, 18th- and 19th-century plantations, and a WWII fort.

Government 

An organic act, establishing how the territory should be governed, was passed by the U.S. Congress on March 3, 1917, before the official acquisition of the islands. The act was meant as a temporary provision and was eventually replaced on June 22, 1936, by the Organic Act of the Virgin Islands of the United States. The Revised Organic Act of the Virgin Islands then repealed and replaced this act in 1954.

The Virgin Islands officially became an unincorporated U.S. territory in 1927. Their first civilian governor, Paul Martin Pearson, was appointed by Herbert Hoover and inaugurated on March 18. 1931. The islands remained under the direct control of the U.S. government until 1968 when residents were first allowed to elect their own governor. In 1972, residents elected their first non-voting delegate to Congress.

President Gerald Ford signed  on October 21, 1976, granting the citizens of the islands the right to organize their own government and establish a constitution. Though none have succeeded, at least four constitutional conventions have since attempted to establish a constitution for the islands: in 1972, 1979, 1981, and 2009. The Revised Organic Act of the Virgin Islands from 1954 remains the article defining the islands' government.

The Fifth Constitutional Convention of the U.S. Virgin Islands passed a proposed constitution on May 26, 2009. The draft was eventually forwarded to President Barack Obama in December, who then submitted it to the United States Congress on February 26, 2010. The office of the President, the U.S. Congress, and the U.S. Department of Justice took issue with several aspects of the document. Congress did not ratify the constitution and instead urged the convention to revise the document. Governor de Jongh issued an act convening the Fifth Revision Convention on September 11, 2012. The delegates met in October 2012 but disagreed on a new draft.

Economy 

After the United States acquired the islands, the Danish West Indian daler remained the currency of the U.S. Virgin Islands until 1934, when the United States dollar became legal tender.

The 1930s represented a watershed as the economy reversed itself because of two external stimuli: The repeal of prohibition in the U.S., which significantly increased the demand for plantation workers, and the wartime decision to construct a submarine base on St. Thomas. Because of chronic out-migration to the U.S. and the historical absence of an agricultural worker tradition, the existing labor supply was insufficient for the growing demand on the islands. This vacuum created a demand for workers from the Eastern Caribbean, resulting in the first of several immigrant waves. The Virgin Islands government set a new policy of export diversification via tourism and light industry. People continued to immigrate in substantial numbers—some legally and others illegally. They benefited from loose interpretations and favorable revisions of immigration law, which reduced occupational restrictions and generally lax enforcement. 
After World War II, tourism became an increasingly important sector within the island's economy. Today, it constitutes their largest industry. As of 2022, the islands have a permanent population of approximately 105,400 people, yet annually receive 2.5–3 million tourists, primarily from cruise ships.

See also
 Outline of the United States Virgin Islands
 Danish West Indies
 History of the Caribbean

References

Notes

Citations

Bibliography

External links
 St. John Historical Society
 Danish West Indies History
 The Danish West-Indies, a primary source search portal maintained by the Danish National Archives.